Maguiresbridge railway station was on the Dundalk and Enniskillen Railway in Northern Ireland.

The Dundalk and Enniskillen Railway opened the station on 1 March 1859.

It closed on 1 October 1957.

Routes

References

Disused railway stations in County Fermanagh
Railway stations opened in 1859
Railway stations closed in 1957
1859 establishments in Ireland
1957 disestablishments in Northern Ireland
Railway stations in Northern Ireland opened in the 19th century